Angylocalyx braunii is a species of flowering plant in the family Fabaceae. It is found in Kenya and Tanzania.

References

Angylocalyceae
Flora of Kenya
Flora of Tanzania
Vulnerable plants
Taxonomy articles created by Polbot